Francisco Caldeira (born 11 October 1948) is a Portuguese equestrian. He competed in two events at the 1972 Summer Olympics.

References

1948 births
Living people
Portuguese male equestrians
Olympic equestrians of Portugal
Equestrians at the 1972 Summer Olympics
Place of birth missing (living people)